Literary Criticism is one of several academic events sanctioned by the University Interscholastic League in the U.S. state of Texas. The contest began in the 1986–87 school year.

Literary Criticism is designed to test students' knowledge of literary history and of critical terms, and ability in literary criticism. The text A Handbook to Literature by William Harmon and C. Hugh Holman (currently, either the 8th, 9th, or 10th edition may be used), state adopted texts, and the announced reading list for the current year will be used as sources for the tests.

Eligibility
Students in Grade 9 to Grade 12 are eligible to enter. All grades compete in one division.

Each school may send up to four students. However, in districts with more than eight schools the district executive committee can limit participation to three students per school. In order for a school to participate in team competition, the school must send at least three students.

Rules and scoring
The test consists of four parts, which must be completed in 90 minutes. A time signal is given when 15 minutes remain.

The questions may be answered in any order. 

Part One consists of thirty questions involving the use of A Handbook to Literature. Part Two consists of twenty questions involving the texts from the announced reading list. Part Three requires a contestant to answer fifteen critical questions about various poems or literary excerpts. Finally, the contestant must write a short essay dealing with a specified topic about a short literary passage.

One point is given for each correct answer in Part One and two points for each correct answer in Parts Two and Three. The essay is not scored but is used as a tiebreaker for individual competition. The contestant who does not write an essay is disqualified from the competition.

Determining the winner
The top three individuals and the top team (based on the scores of the top three individuals) will advance to the next round. In addition, within each region, the highest-scoring second place team from all district competitions advances as the "wild card" to the regional competition (provided the team has four members) and, within the state, the highest-scoring second place team from all regional competitions advances as the wild card to the state competition. Members of advancing teams who were not placed individually remain eligible to compete for individual awards at higher levels.

For individual competition, the tiebreaker is the essay. Three judges (none of whom shall be the student's coach) evaluate the essay based on the following criteria:

how well the contestant followed the instructions accompanying the questions;
the excellence of the literary insights expressed;
the effectiveness of the written expression; and
the grammatical correctness of the writing.

For team competition, the score of the fourth-place individual is used as the tiebreaker (not including the essay). If a team has only three members it is not eligible to participate in the tiebreaker. If the fourth-place score still results in a tie, the individual tiebreaker rules will not apply, and all remaining tied teams will advance. At the state level ties for first place are not broken.

For district meet academic championship and district meet sweepstakes awards, points are awarded to the school as follows:
Individual places: 1st–15, 2nd–12, 3rd–10, 4th–8, 5th–6, and 6th–4.
Team places: 1st–10 and 2nd–5.
The maximum number of points a school can earn in Literary Criticism is 37.

List of prior winners

Individual
NOTE: For privacy reasons, only the winning school is shown.

Team
NOTE: UIL did not recognize a team championship in this event until the 1992–93 scholastic year.

References

External links
 Official UIL Rules for Literary Criticism

1980s establishments in Texas
Events in Texas
University Interscholastic League